Harry Fouts Hazlett (April 17, 1884 – September 27, 1960) was a career officer in the U.S. Army. Prior to that he was an American football coach for the Canton Professionals-Bulldogs of the "Ohio League", which was the direct predecessor to the modern National Football League, as well as the head football and basketball coach at Canton McKinley High School. He was fired as the head coach of the Canton Bulldogs, by manager Jack Cusack, after he benched Canton rookie Jim Thorpe for the first game of the 1915 league title game. The first game in the two-game series resulted in a 16–0 victory over the Bulldogs by their rivals, the Massillon Tigers. It is unknown why Hazlett benched Thorpe. Some historians feel it was due to Thorpe not having time to practice with the team, while others feel that he was resentful of Thorpe's high salary. After Hazlett was fired, the Bulldogs' quarterback, Don Hamilton, left the team in protest. Thorpe was later named the team's new head coach and led the Bulldogs to the 1915 championship, which was split between Canton and Massillon.

Biography
Hazlett joined the Ohio National Guard as a captain in 1916 and participated in the Mexican Expedition. During World War I, he served as a machine gun officer and was cited for bravery. After the war, he taught at the University of Akron and the University of Dayton as a Professor of Military Science and Tactics. Before World War II, Hazlett attended the Army War College and published a paper, Procurement and Processing during the Voluntary Enlistment Period of Initial Mobilization, in 1933. Then Lt. Colonel Hazlett served as an instructor at the Army Command and General Staff School at Fort Leavenworth from 1935 to 1936.

During 1945, Hazlett served as Commanding General of the Replacement and School Command. In June 1946, he succeeded Major General Paul J. Mueller as commander of the 86th Infantry Division. He commanded the division until it was deactivated in December 1946 on Leyte, Philippines. After commanding the 86th, he was the Post Commander at Yokohama, Japan until 1947.

In retirement Hazlett lived in California. He is buried in Arlington National Cemetery.

References 
The Field Artillery Journal issue 8, August 1945, pg. 501

External links 
 Field Artillery Journal, August 1945 
 Remarkable Ohio
 Annual Report of the Army Command and General Staff College 1935–1936
 Canton-McKinley Football Coaching Recording
 Canton-McKinley Basketball Coaching Recording
 
Generals of World War II

1884 births
1960 deaths
Military personnel from Ohio
United States Army personnel of World War I
University of Akron faculty
University of Dayton faculty
Recipients of the Croix de guerre (Belgium)
Recipients of the Distinguished Service Medal (US Army)
Canton Bulldogs coaches
Burials at Arlington National Cemetery
People from Harrison County, Ohio
United States Army generals of World War II
United States Army generals
United States Army War College alumni